El profesor particular (English title:The private professor) is a Mexican telenovela by Televisa produced by Arcadio Gamboa and directed by Manolo García for Telesistema Mexicano. Is original story and adaptation by Julio Alejandro.

Cast 
Luz María Aguilar
Isabelita Blanch
Aurora Castillón
Josefina Escobedo
Bárbara Gil
Juan Manuel González
Miguel Manzano
Fernando Mendoza
Ramón Menéndez
Ricardo Mondragón
Juan Felipe Preciado
Alicia Rodríguez
Dolores Tinoco
Enrique Álvarez Félix

References 

Mexican telenovelas
1971 telenovelas
Televisa telenovelas
Spanish-language telenovelas
1971 Mexican television series debuts
1971 Mexican television series endings